The men's 400 metres at the 2019 World Para Athletics Championships was held in Dubai 7–15 November.

Medalists

Detailed results

T11

T12

T13

T20

T34

T36

T37

T38

T44

T47

T52

T53

T54

T62

See also 
 List of IPC world records in athletics

References 

400 metres
2019 in men's athletics
400 metres at the World Para Athletics Championships